Llica Municipality is the first municipal section of the Daniel Campos Province in the Potosí Department in Bolivia. Its seat is Llica.

The municipality is situated on the western side of the Salar de Uyuni bordering Tahua Municipality. To the north it is bordered by the Oruro Department, to the south by the Nor Lipez Province and to the west by Chile.

Geography 
Some of the highest mountains of the municipality are listed below:

Subdivision 
The municipality consists of the following cantons: 
 Cahuana
 Canquella
 Chacoma
 Llica
 Palaya
 San Pablo de Napa
 Tres Cruces

The people 
The people are predominantly indigenous citizens of Aymara descent.

References

External links 
Llica Municipality: population data and map

Municipalities of Potosí Department